Transportes Aéreos Cielos Andinos, normally referred to as Cielos Andinos, is an airline based in Lima, Peru. Its main base is Jorge Chávez International Airport in Lima. It began domestic operations on July 9, 2007, to Andahuaylas. Future destinations include Cajamarca, Ayacucho, Cusco, Puerto Maldonado, Chimbote and Arequipa.

This airline appears to be no longer in business. Website does not exist any longer!

Destinations 
Andahuaylas (Andahuaylas Airport)
Ayacucho (Coronel FAP Alfredo Mendívil Duarte Airport)
Lima (Jorge Chávez International Airport)

Future destinations 
 Arequipa (Rodríguez Ballón International Airport)
 Cajamarca (Mayor General FAP Armando Revoredo Iglesias Airport)
 Cusco (Alejandro Velasco Astete International Airport)
 Puerto Maldonado (Padre Aldamiz International Airport)
 Chimbote

Fleet

References 

Defunct airlines of Peru